Paia may refer to:

PAiA Electronics, an American synthesizer kit company established in 1967
Paia, Hawaii, a census-designated place in Maui County, Hawaii
Paia, a type of embutido, an Iberian variety of cured, dry sausage
Promotion of Access to Information Act, 2000, a South African law
Grete Paia (born 1995), an Estonian singer
Ian Paia (born 1990), a Solomon Islands footballer
 Paia (Samoa), a village in the Gagaʻifomauga district of Samoa

See also
Botoșești-Paia, a commune in Dolj County, Romania 
Paio (disambiguation)